France was the host country of the 1992 Winter Paralympics in Tignes-Albertville. The country's delegation was the joint second largest at the Games, consisting in 31 competitors (28 men and 3 women) in all three sports: alpine skiing, biathlon and cross-country skiing.

French athletes won a total of six gold medals, four silver, and nine bronze, placing it sixth on the medal table. France's gold medallists were: 
 Lionel Brun in the Men's giant slalom LW6/8, with a real time of 2:12.92.
 Lionel Brun in the Men's slalom LW6/8, with a real time of 1:16.42.
 Stephane Saas in the Men's giant slalom B2, with a real time of 2:36.14.
 Stephane Saas in the Men's super-G B2, with a real time of 1:28.32.
 Jean-Yves Arvier in the Men's short distance 5 km LW6/8 with a real time of 16:12.7.
 André Favre in the Men's long distance 20 km LW2,4 with a real time of 53:15.8.

See also
 France at the 1992 Winter Olympics

References

Nations at the 1992 Winter Paralympics
1992
Paralympics